Major Charles Westley Hume (13 January 1886 – 22 September 1981) OBE MC BSc was a British animal welfare worker and writer.

Biography

Hume graduated in physics from Birkbeck College. He was honorary secretary of the British Science Guild and edited the journal Proceedings of the Physical Society (1919–1940). He served in the Royal Engineers during World War I and the 47th Divisional Signals (Territorial Army) during World War II.

Hume founded the University of London Animal Welfare Society (ULAWS) in 1926, which later became the Universities Federation for Animal Welfare (UFAW). He has also been credited as the first to use the expression "animal welfare". Through his efforts the first book on the care and management of laboratory animals was published by the UFAW in 1947. Richard P. Haynes has suggested that "Hume should be credited as the father of the animal welfare movement".

Hume's book Man and Beast (1962) explores the history, law, philosophy and theology underlying cruelty to animals. A review noted that "these subjects are dealt with objectively and clearly, lightly yet seriously, tactfully yet persistently, especially in the factual and historical aspects."

In 1956, Hume received the Schweitzer Medal for his contributions to animal welfare. The Charles Hume Memorial Fund was set up in his honour.

Selected publications

Law and Practice: The Rights of Laboratory Animals. In The UFAW Handbook on the Care and Management of Laboratory Animals (Edited by Alastair N. Worden, 1947) 
The Status of Animals in the Christian Religion (1956)
Man and Beast (1962)

See also

UFAW Handbook

References

Further reading
Michael Balls. (2013). UFAW and Major Charles Hume. Alternatives to Laboratory Animals 41 (6): 82–84.

1886 births
1981 deaths
20th-century British non-fiction writers
Alumni of Birkbeck, University of London
British animal welfare scholars
British animal welfare workers
Members of the Order of the British Empire
Royal Engineers officers